Winogradsky is a surname. Notable people with the surname include:

 Winogradsky family from Tokmak, Ukraine, sons of Olga and Isaac Winogradsky:
 Lew Grade (born Louis Winogradsky)
 Bernard Delfont (born Boris Winogradsky)
 Leslie Grade (born László Winogradsky)
 Michael Grade, son of Leslie
 Éric Winogradsky, French tennis player
 Sergei Winogradsky, Ukrainian scientist
Winogradsky column, a device designed to analyze several types of microorganisms and their energy sources
Vinogradsky (crater), a Martian impact crater
 Alexander Avraham Winogradsky,(usual name: Alexander A. Winogradsky Frenkel) a Russian born Soviet citizen, now a psycho-linguist and Eastern Orthodox archpriest of the patriarchate of Jerusalem.